TAHR may become:

 Tahr, a type of mammal
 Taiwan Association for Human Rights, an organization in Taiwan